The College of Cardinals, or more formally the Sacred College of Cardinals, is the body of all cardinals of the Catholic Church.  its membership is , of whom  are eligible to vote in a conclave to elect a new pope. Cardinals are appointed by the pope for life. Changes in life expectancy partly account for the increases in the size of the college.

Since the emergence of the College of Cardinals in the early Middle Ages, the size of the body has historically been limited by popes, ecumenical councils ratified by the pope, and even the College itself. The total number of cardinals from 1099 to 1986 has been about 2,900 (excluding possible undocumented 12th-century cardinals and pseudocardinals appointed during the Western Schism by pontiffs now considered to be antipopes, and subject to some other sources of uncertainty), nearly half of whom were created after 1655.

History 

The word cardinal is derived from the Latin cardō, meaning "hinge". The office of cardinal as it is known today slowly evolved during the first millennium from the clergy of Rome. "The first time that the term cardinal appears in the Liber Pontificalis is in the biography of Pope Stephen III when in the Roman Synod of 769, it was decided that the Roman pontiff should be elected from among the deacons and cardinal priests."

In 845 the Council of Meaux–Paris "required Bishops to establish Cardinal titles or parishes in their towns and outlining districts". At the same time, the popes began referring to the cardinal priests of Rome to serve as legates and delegates within Rome at ceremonies, synods, councils, etc., as well as abroad on diplomatic missions and councils. Those who were assigned to the latter roles were given the titles of Legatus a latere (Cardinal Legate) and Missus Specialis (Special Missions).

During the pontificate of Stephen V (816–17), the three classes of the College that are present today began to form.  Stephen decreed that all cardinal-bishops were bound to sing Mass on rotation at the high altar at St. Peter's Basilica, one per Sunday. The first class to form was that of the cardinal-deacons, direct theological descendants of the original seven ordained in Acts 6, followed by the cardinal-priests, and finally, the cardinal-bishops.

The College played an integral part in various reforms within the Church as well, as early as the pontificate of Pope Leo IX (1050). In the 12th century, the Third Lateran Council declared that only Cardinals could assume the papacy, a requirement that has since lapsed. In 1130, under Urban II, all the classes were permitted to take part in papal elections; up to this point, only cardinal-bishops had this role.

From the 13th to 15th centuries, the size of the College of Cardinals never exceeded thirty, although there were more than thirty parishes and diaconal districts which could potentially have a titular holder; Pope John XXII (1316–1334) formalized this norm by limiting the college to twenty members. In the ensuing century, increasing the size of the College became a method for the pope to raise funds for construction or war, cultivate European alliances, and dilute the strength of the college as a spiritual and political counterweight to papal supremacy.

Size of the College 
The conclave capitulation of the 1352 papal conclave limited the size of the college to twenty, and decreed that no new cardinals could be created until the size of the college had dropped to 16; however, Pope Innocent VI declared the capitulation invalid the following year.

By the end of the 14th century, the practice of having solely Italian cardinals had ceased. Between the 14th century and 17th century, there was much struggle for the College between the cardinals of the day and the reigning popes. The most effective way for a pope to increase his power was to increase the number of cardinals, promoting those who had nominated him. Those cardinals in power saw these actions as an attempt to weaken their influence.

The Council of Basel (1431–1437, later transferred to Ferrara and then Florence) limited the size of the college to 24, as did the capitulation of the 1464 papal conclave. The capitulations of the 1484 (Pope Innocent VIII) and 1513 (Pope Leo X) conclaves contained the same restriction. The capitulation of the 1492 papal conclave also is known to have contained some restriction on the creation of new cardinals.

The Fifth Council of the Lateran (1512–1517), despite its lengthy regulation of the lives of cardinals, did not consider the size of the college.

In 1517 Pope Leo X added another thirty-one cardinals, bringing the total to sixty-five so that he could have a supportive majority in the College of Cardinals. Paul IV brought the total to seventy. His immediate successor, Pope Pius IV (1559–1565), raised the limit to seventy-six. Although Ferdinand I, Holy Roman Emperor sought a limit of 26 and complained about the size and quality of the college to his legates to the Council of Trent, and some French attendees advocated a limit of 24, that Council did not prescribe a limit to the size of the college. By the papacy of Sixtus V (1585–1590), the number was set at seventy on 3 December 1586, divided among fourteen cardinal-deacons, fifty cardinal-priests, and six cardinal-bishops.

Popes respected that limit until Pope John XXIII increased the number of cardinals several times to 88 in January 1961 and Pope Paul VI continued this expansion, reaching 134 at his third consistory in April 1969.

Maximum number of electors 
The total size of the College lost its significance when Paul VI decided to allow only cardinals under the age of 80 to vote in a conclave from 1971 onward. Then, in 1975, Paul set the maximum number of those under 80, the cardinal electors, at 120. His next consistory in 1976 brought the number of cardinal electors to its full complement of 120.

All of Paul's successors have at times exceeded the 120 maximum (except for Pope John Paul I, who did not hold any consistory during his very short pontificate). Pope John Paul II reiterated the 120 maximum in 1996, yet his appointments to the College resulted in more than 120 cardinal electors on 4 of his nine consistories, reaching a high of 135 in February 2001 and again in October 2003. Three of Pope Benedict XVI's five consistories resulted in more than 120 cardinal electors, the high being 125 in 2012. Pope Francis has exceeded the limit in all seven of his consistories, reaching as high as 128 in October 2019 and in November 2020.

Orders
Other changes to the College in the 20th century affected specific orders. The 1917 Code of Canon Law decreed that from then on only those who were priests or bishops could be chosen as cardinals, thus officially closing the historical period in which some cardinals could be clergy who had only received first tonsure and minor order, or the major orders of deacon and subdeacon without a further ordaination to the preisthood. In 1961 Pope John XXIII reserved to the pope the right to assign any member of College to one of the suburbicarian sees and the rank of cardinal bishop. Previously only the senior cardinal priest and the senior cardinal deacon had the privilege of requesting such an appointment (jus optionis) when a vacancy occurred. In 1962 he established that all cardinals should be bishops, ending the identification of the order of cardinal deacon with cardinals who were not bishops. He consecrated the twelve non-bishop members of the College himself. In February 1965, Pope Paul VI decided that an Eastern Rite Patriarch who is created a cardinal would no longer be assigned a titular church in Rome, but maintain his see and join the order of cardinal bishops, the rank previously reserved to the six cardinals assigned to the suburbicarian dioceses. He also required that the suburbicarian bishops elect one of themselves as the Dean and Vice-Dean of the college, instead of allowing them to select any member of the college. In June 2018, Pope Francis eased the rules governing the rank of cardinal bishop to open that rank to anyone of the pope's choosing, granting such cardinals the same privileges as those assigned suburbicarian sees.

Other modifications 
Pope Francis adjusted the rules regarding the Dean in December 2019, so they now serve for a term of 5 years which can be renewed by the Pope. No change was made regarding the Vice-Dean.

The resignation or removal of members has been a relatively rare phenomenon. Between 1791 and 2018, only one was removed from the College – Étienne Charles de Loménie de Brienne in 1791 – and five resigned: Tommaso Antici in 1798, Marino Carafa di Belevedere in 1807, Carlo Odescalchi in 1838, Louis Billot in 1927, and Theodore Edgar McCarrick in 2018.

Historical data
For the Middle Ages, sources concerning the size of the College of Cardinals are most frequently those relating to papal elections and conclaves.

Functions

A function of the college is to advise the pope about church matters when he summons them to an ordinary consistory, a term derived from the Roman Emperor's crown council. It also attends various functions as a matter of protocol, for example, during the canonization process.

It also convenes on the death or resignation of a pope as a papal conclave to elect a successor, but is then restricted to eligible Cardinals under the age limit, which was set for the first time in 1970 by Pope Paul VI at 80.

The college has no ruling power except during the sede vacante (papal vacancy) period, and even then its powers are extremely limited by the terms of the current law, which is laid down in the Apostolic constitution Universi Dominici gregis (1996) and the Fundamental Law of Vatican City State.

Historically, cardinals were the clergy serving parishes of the city of Rome under its bishop, the pope. The college acquired particular importance following the crowning of Henry IV as King of Germany and Holy Roman Emperor at the age of six, after the unexpected death of Henry III in 1056. Until then, the Holy See was often bitterly fought for among Rome's aristocratic families and external secular authorities had significant influence over who was to be appointed pope, and the Holy Roman Emperor in particular had the special power to appoint him. This was significant as the aims and views of the Holy Roman Emperor and the Church did not always coincide. Churchmen involved in what has become known as the Gregorian Reform took advantage of the new king's lack of power and in 1059 reserved the election of the pope to the clergy of the Church in Rome. This was part of a larger power struggle, which became known as the Investiture Controversy, as the Church and the Emperor each attempted to gain more control over the appointment of bishops, and in doing so wield more influence in the lands and governments they were appointed to. Reserving to the cardinals the election of the pope represented a significant shift in the balance of power in the Early Medieval world. From the beginning of the 12th century, the College of Cardinals started to meet as such, when the cardinal bishops, cardinal priests and cardinal deacons ceased acting as separate groups.

Officials
In the Catholic church, the Dean of the College of Cardinals and the Cardinal Vice-Dean are the president and vice-president of the college. Both are elected by and from the cardinal bishops (cardinals of the highest order, including those holding suburbicarian dioceses), but the election requires papal confirmation. Except for presiding and delegating administrative tasks, they have no authority over the cardinals, acting as primus inter pares (first among equals).

The Secretary of Roman Curia, the Camerlengo of the Holy Roman Church, the Vicar General of Rome, and the Patriarchs of Venice and Lisbon, are usually cardinals, with few, usually temporary, exceptions. The Fundamental Law of Vatican City State requires that appointees to the state's legislative body, the Pontifical Commission for Vatican City State, be cardinals.

Electing the pope

Under the terms of Pope Paul VI's 1970 motu proprio Ingravescentem aetatem, cardinals who reached the age of 80 before a conclave opened had no vote in papal elections. Pope John Paul II's Universi Dominici gregis of 22 February 1996 modified that rule slightly, so that cardinals who have reached the age of 80 before the day the see becomes vacant are not eligible to vote.

Canon law sets the general qualifications for a man to be appointed bishop quite broadly, requiring someone of faith and good reputation, at least thirty-five years old and with a certain level of education and five years' experience as a priest. The cardinals have nevertheless consistently elected the Bishop of Rome from among their own membership since the death of Pope Urban VI (the last non-cardinal to become pope) in 1389. The conclave rules specify the procedures to be followed should they elect someone residing outside Vatican City or not yet a bishop.

Of the 117 cardinals under the age of 80 at the time of Pope Benedict XVI's resignation, 115 participated in the conclave of March 2013 that elected his successor. The two who did not participate were Julius Riyadi Darmaatmadja (for health reasons) and Keith O'Brien (following allegations of sexual misconduct).

See also

 Bishop (Catholic Church)
 Camerlengo of the Sacred College of Cardinals
 Catholic Church by country
 Catholic Church hierarchy
 Index of Vatican City-related articles
 List of the creations of the cardinals
 List of titular churches
 Palatinus (Roman Catholic Church)
 Papabile
 Protopriest

Notes

References

Citations

Sources 
 Baumgartner, Frederic J. 2003. Behind Locked Doors: A History of the Papal Elections. Palgrave Macmillan. .
 Broderick, J.F. 1987. "The Sacred College of Cardinals: Size and Geographical Composition (1099–1986)." Archivum historiae Pontificiae, 25: 7–71.
 Levillain, Philippe, ed. 2002. The Papacy: An Encyclopedia. Routledge. .
 Pham, John-Peter. 2004. Heirs of the Fisherman: Behind the Scenes of Papal Death and Succession. Oxford University Press. .
 Walsh, Michael. 2003. The Conclave: A Sometimes Secret and Occasionally Bloody History of Papal Elections. Rowman & Littlefield. .

External links
 The College of Cardinals—Holy See Press Office
 GCatholic.org—extensive information on all cardinals since the 17th century
 Cardinals of the Catholic Church—sortable list, often slightly out of date on deaths
 Catholic-Hierarchy.org, with entry into extensive databases.